Kristian Adelmund (born 1 February 1987) is a Dutch former professional footballer who played as a defender.

Club career
Adelmund played in the youth teams of Feyenoord and Sparta Rotterdam but started his senior career at amateur side SHO after Sparta released him in summer 2008. He moved on to VV Capelle a year later before leaving to pursue a professional career in Indonesia.

References

External links 
 Kristian Adelmund Interview

1987 births
Living people
Footballers from Rotterdam
Dutch footballers
Association football defenders
Indonesian Premier Division players
VV Capelle players
PSIM Yogyakarta players
Persepam Madura Utama players
PSS Sleman players
Persela Lamongan players
SC Feyenoord players
Dutch expatriate footballers
Dutch expatriate sportspeople in Indonesia
Expatriate footballers in Indonesia